The Yuneec International ETrike is a Chinese electric ultralight trike that was designed and produced by Yuneec International of Kunshan, Jiangsu. The aircraft was originally intended to be supplied complete and ready-to-fly, but does not seem to have progressed beyond a few prototypes.

By 2013 the ETrike was not offered for sale by either Yuneec International or its North American licensee, GreenWing International.

Design and development
It features a cable-braced hang glider-style high-wing, weight-shift controls, a single-seat open cockpit without a cockpit fairing, tricycle landing gear and a single electric motor in pusher configuration.

The aircraft is made from bolted-together aluminum tubing, with its double surface wing covered in Dacron sailcloth. Its  span wing is supported by a single tube-type kingpost and uses an "A" frame weight-shift control bar. The powerplant is a  Yuneec Power Drive 10 electric motor.

Specifications (ETrike)

References

2000s Chinese sport aircraft
2000s Chinese ultralight aircraft
Single-engined pusher aircraft
Electric aircraft
Ultralight trikes